Twin bridges are a set of two bridges running parallel to each other.  A pair of twin bridges is often referred to collectively as a twin-span or dual-span bridge.  Twin bridges are independent structures and each bridge has its own superstructure, substructure, and foundation. Bridges of this type are often created by building a new bridge parallel to an existing one in order to increase the traffic capacity of the crossing.  While most twin-span bridges consist of two identical bridges, this is not always the case.

For a bridge owner, twin bridges can improve the maintenance and management of the structures. For motorists, twin bridges can limit the risk that both directions of traffic will be disrupted by an accident.

Examples
Carquinez Bridge – original cantilever span built in 1927 and later twinned in 1958; a newer suspension span was built in 2003 to replace the original 1927 span, which was later demolished in 2007.
Chesapeake Bay Bridge – twin suspension spans with notable visual differences in construction techniques.
Delaware Memorial Bridge – identical twin spans built 18 years apart from one another.
Maria Skłodowska-Curie Bridge – almost identical triplets.
Donald and Morris Goodkind Bridges – original Art Deco arch span built in 1929; newer steel bridge built in 1976.
Crescent City Connection – original cantilever span opened in 1958; parallel span opened in 1988
Lake Pontchartrain Causeway – the longest twin-span bridge in the world. Original span opened in 1956, second span in 1969
Bi-State Vietnam Gold Star  Bridges – pair of cantilever bridges over the Ohio River. First span opened in 1932, second span in 1965.
Blue Water Bridge - Border crossing between Port Huron, Michigan (United States) and Sarnia, Ontario (Canada).
Québec Bridge
Sir Leo Hielscher Bridges
Iron Cove Bridge
Tacoma Narrows Bridge
Daniel Carter Beard Bridge
Tappan Zee Bridge – originally a single span in 1955, rebuilt into a new double span in 2017, old bridge demolished
Newburgh–Beacon Bridge – originally a single span in 1963, 2nd span added in 1980
Thaddeus Kosciusko Bridge – commonly referred to as the "Twin Bridges", or just "The Twins"
Kosciuszko Bridge – twin cable-stayed spans, with their pylons mirrored on opposite sides of Newtown Creek
South Grand Island Bridge

References

Structural engineering
Bridge design
Duos